The 2016 Judo Grand Prix Tbilisi was held at the Olympic Palace in Tbilisi, Georgia from 25 to 27 March 2016.

Medal summary

Men's events

Women's events

Source Results

Medal table

References

External links
 

2016 IJF World Tour
2016 Judo Grand Prix
Judo
Grand Prix 2016
Judo